Chronic bacterial prostatitis is a bacterial infection of the prostate gland. It should be distinguished from other forms of prostatitis such as acute bacterial prostatitis and chronic pelvic pain syndrome (CPPS).

Signs and symptoms
Chronic bacterial prostatitis is a relatively rare condition that usually presents with an intermittent UTI-type picture. It is defined as recurrent urinary tract infections in men originating from a chronic infection in the prostate. Symptoms may be completely absent until there is also bladder infection, and the most troublesome problem is usually recurrent cystitis. It has been said that recurrent and relapsing UTIs (i.e., UTIs due to the same pathogen) are a hallmark of chronic bacterial prostatitis.

Chronic bacterial prostatitis occurs in less than 5% of patients with prostate-related non-BPH lower urinary tract symptoms (LUTS).

Dr. Weidner, Professor of Medicine, Department of Urology, University of Gießen, has stated: "In studies of 656 men, we seldom found chronic bacterial prostatitis. It is truly a rare disease. Most of those were E-coli."

Diagnosis
In chronic bacterial prostatitis, there are bacteria in the prostate, but there may be no symptoms or milder symptoms than occur with acute prostatitis. The prostate infection is diagnosed by culturing urine as well as prostate fluid (expressed prostatic secretions or EPS) which are obtained by the doctor performing a rectal exam and putting pressure on the prostate. If no fluid is recovered after this prostatic massage, a post massage urine should also contain any prostatic bacteria.

Prostate specific antigen levels may be elevated, although there is no malignancy. Semen analysis is a useful diagnostic tool. Semen cultures are also performed. Antibiotic sensitivity testing is also done to select the appropriate antibiotic. Other useful markers of infection are seminal elastase and seminal cytokines.

Treatment
Antibiotic therapy has to overcome the blood/prostate barrier that prevents many antibiotics from reaching levels that are higher than minimum inhibitory concentration. A blood-prostate barrier restricts cell and molecular movement across the rat ventral prostate epithelium. Treatment requires prolonged courses (4–8 weeks) of antibiotics that penetrate the prostate well. The fluoroquinolones, tetracyclines and macrolides have the best penetration. There have been contradictory findings regarding the penetrability of nitrofurantoin , quinolones (ciprofloxacin, levofloxacin), sulfas (Bactrim, Septra), doxycycline and macrolides (erythromycin, clarithromycin). This is particularly true for gram-positive infections. Certain other antibiotics with the potential for improved activity, including linezolid, moxifloxacin, tigecycline, daptomycin, clindamycin, and vancomycin, have been used limitedly off-label with reported success.

In a review of multiple studies, levofloxacin was found to reach prostatic fluid concentrations 5.5 times higher than ciprofloxacin, indicating a greater ability to penetrate the prostate. Moxifloxacin shows even greater prostatic penetration than levofloxacin and may be the only fluoroquinolone able to obtain prostatic concentrations 10-fold above the minimum inhibitory concentration against Enterococcus faecalis. However, limited experience with moxifloxacin for chronic prostatitis exists.

Clinical success rates with oral antibiotics can reach 70% to 90% at 6 months, although trials comparing them with placebo or no treatment do not exist.

Persistent infections may be helped in 80% of patients by the use of alpha blockers (tamsulosin, alfuzosin), or long term low dose antibiotic therapy. Recurrent infections may be caused by inefficient urination (benign prostatic hypertrophy, neurogenic bladder), prostatic stones or a structural abnormality that acts as a reservoir for infection.

In theory, the ability of some strains of bacteria to form biofilms might be one of the factors that facilitate development of chronic bacterial prostatitis.

Bacteriophages hold promise as another potential treatment for chronic bacterial prostatitis.

The addition of prostate massage to courses of antibiotics was previously proposed as being beneficial and prostate massage may mechanically break up the biofilm and enhance the drainage of the prostate gland. However, in more recent trials, this was not shown to improve outcome compared to antibiotics alone.

Prostatectomy has been used to treat chronic bacterial prostatitis but inadequate data —including no randomized controlled trials— exists to allow clinical decisions. Moreover, prostatectomy can result in erectile dysfunction and urinary incontinence as complications.

Prognosis
Over time, the relapse rate is high, exceeding 50%. However, recent research indicates that combination therapies offer a better prognosis than antibiotics alone.

A 2007 study showed that repeated combination pharmacological therapy with antibacterial agents (ciprofloxacin/azithromycin), alpha-blockers (alfuzosin) and Serenoa repens extracts may eradicate infection in 83.9% of patients with clinical remission extending throughout a follow-up period of 30 months for 94% of these patients.

A 2014 study of 210 patients randomized into two treatment groups found that recurrence occurred within 2 months in 27.6% of the group using antibiotics alone (prulifloxacin 600 mg), but in only 7.8% of the group taking prulifloxacin in combination with Serenoa repens extract, Lactobacillus Sporogens and Arbutin.

Large prostatic stones was shown to be related with the presence of bacteria, a higher urinary symptoms and pain score, a higher IL-1β and IL-8 concentration in seminal plasma, a greater prostatic inflammation and a lower response to antibiotic treatment.

Additional images

References

External links 

 
 

Bacterial diseases
Sexually transmitted diseases and infections
Inflammatory prostate disorders